Amit Saigal (6 July 1965 – 5 January 2012) was an Indian rock musician, promoter of rock music, publisher and impresario. Saigal founded the music magazine Rock Street Journal and promoted rock music in India. Amit was also termed as "Papa Rock" by the rock music community of India.

Career
Amit Saigal's Rock Street Journal (RSJ) was the first rock magazine in India. He started RSJ in 1993. Saigal printed 2,500 copies of RSJ from his hometown, Allahabad.

Saigal used RSJ to promote rock concerts, such as the Great Indian Rock festival (GIR) that toured metros to Pub Rock fest and introduced rock/indie music to various clubs around the country.

He had over 25 years of experience in the music business in India, and was closely involved in the club as well as the concert market in India, and had been an encouragement to many emerging rock bands and musicians.

Saigal was also part of a band called Impact that played classic rock songs.

Death
On 5 January 2012, while on vacation, Saigal and his friends had gone for a swim after anchoring his sailboat off Bogmalo beach in Goa. Saigal reportedly drowned due to unknown reasons. By the time lifeguards could reach him, he was already dead.

See also
Rock music

References

External links
Rock Street Journal

1965 births
2012 deaths
Accidental deaths in India
Deaths by drowning in India
Indian magazine founders
Indian rock musicians
Musicians from Allahabad
Impresarios
Indian publishers (people)
Magazine publishers (people)
20th-century Indian musicians